The men's elimination race competition at the 2019  UEC European Track Championships was held on 16 October 2019.

Results

References

Men's elimination race
European Track Championships – Men's elimination race